Karjurock  is a Finnish rock festival held annually in Nopperla farm in Uusikaupunki. Karjurock was first held in 2007, and since then, it has grown from a small village festival to attract 15,000 visitors.

In the beginning Karjurock lasted only for one day, but nowadays the 3-day festival is divided into family day on Thursday and more program for adults on Friday and Saturday. Famous artist that have played in Karjurock include Apocalyptica, Lordi, Cheek, Apulanta, Haloo Helsinki!, Hurriganes, Popeda and Mikko Alatalo.

Karjurock is organized by South Festivals Oy.

2007 

2007 was the first year of Karjurock, and the festival lasted only for one day (28 July). The artists performing were Kike Elomaa, Dinturist, DJ-Jarcco and Karjalankannas that played Irwin Goodman cover songs.

Festival attracted 600 to 800 visitors that day.

2008 

In 2008, Karjurock was still only a one-day festival, but it lasted for 15 hours from 12pm until 3am.
The musical acts included the same artists as the previous year, Kike Elomaa, Dinturist and DJ-Jarcco. Other artists performing were Frederik, RainioBros, Groove President, Sepi Kumpulainen, Jailbreak, The Override and Holysmoke.

In its second year, the festival had about 1,500 to 2,000 visitors.

2009 

2009 was the first year Karjurock was organized as a two-day festival. The festival was held 10–11 July. 
On Friday, the artists performing were Dingo, Sepi Kumpulainen, HALO, Mustat Enkelit, The Freza, Kike Elomaa and DJ-Jarcco. On Saturday, the artists were Anna Abreu, Aikakone, Matti Nykänen, Kehä 4, Dinturist and Flash Rock.

There were about 3,000 visitors.

2010 

In 2010, the festival was expanded to last for three days (16-18 July). The artists were more popular and widely known than in the previous years and the festival had also its first foreign act.
On Friday, the artists were Eppu Normaali, Hurriganes, Peer Günt, Heavenly Place, Raggars and The Override. Saturday's main performer was the Swedish eurodance artist Pandora. Other artists were Pelle Miljoona, Vicky Rosti & Menneisyyden Vangit, Turo's Hevi Gee, The Moistmaker, Routalempi, Sepi Kumpulainen and Dinturist. On Sunday the stage was taken over by Dr.Doctor, Kike Elomaa, Tauski Peltonen and The Freza.

The visitor amount exceeded 5,000 visitors.

2011 

Karjurock was held 15–17 July and it lasted for three days. 
Friday's acts were Suurlähettiläät, Mamba, Jean S., Janne Hurme, Eurooppa 3 and Kai Merilä's Rock'n Cover Band. On Saturday, the Karju Stage was taken over by Kotiteollisuus, Negative, Irina, Hausmylly, Legendary Danny Show, Vilperin Perikunta, Human Temple and Dinturist. Sunday was a picnic-day for the whole family and the program included for example country-disco.

There were altogether 6,000 visitors.

2012 

In 2012, Kajrurock lasted once again for three days (20-22 July). On Friday the main stage performers were Apulanta, Klamydia, Jukka Poika and the Australian band The Happy Endings. On Saturday the countryside was filled with music by Lordi, Kilpi, Lauri Tähkä, Paula Koivuniemi, Muska and Isak Rothovius. On Sunday, the festival was topped up by Apocalyptica. Other performers on Sunday were Magna Vice and Sextans.

For the first time ever, there was a smaller stage(pikkulava), which was for the rising stars and newborn bands. The artists there were Corona Skies, Planet Fallout, The Spyro, The 5th of April, E-135, Dinturist, Noora Salminen, Kai Merilä Rock’n Cover Band, Motorcycles Rockband, Los Bibbalos, Dr. Doctor, After Wildfire, Harmi, Gangster of Love and Human Temple.

There were 9,500 visitors.

2013 

The festival lasted for two days (19-20 July)
On Friday, the main stage was taken over by Popeda, Cheek, Paula Koivuniemi, Petri Nygård, Peer Günt and The 5th of April. On Saturday, the artists were Haloo Helsinki!, Don Johnson Big Band, Elonkerjuu, J. Karjalainen, Mariska & Pahat Sudet, Dinturist, Dr. Doctor and Kai Merilä Rock'n Cover Band. The small stage was moved to the big tent and the artists there were Alice Airbuzz, Viper Arms, Grammers, Jailbreak and Raaka-Aine.

The festival was hosted by DJ Jarcco and Iriz Silander. Despite of lasting only two days, this year's festival attracted most visitors during the festivals history with 12,000 visitors.

2014 

The 2014 Karjurock was held 18–20 July.
On Friday, the main stage performers were JVG, Paula Koivuniemi, Anna Abreu, Yö and The 5th of April. On the small stage the artists were Dr. Doctor, Mursusikari, Snake Bait and Soulless Soul. On Saturday, the main stage performers were Freeman, Jimmy Cola, Dinturist, Elastinen, Suvi Teräsniska, Stratovarius, Helloween(the main performance) and Jussi and Ressu. The small stage had Aamuyön Sirkus, Overnight Sensation, Kai Merilä Rock'n Cover Band, Jail Break, Array, HAngman's Voodoo, Stone Monolith and Nitroforce 9. On Sunday the sole performer was Mikko Alatalo.

There were about 12,000 visitors.

2018 

The 2018 Karjurock is held 19–21 July. The confirmed artists so far are Las Ketchup, Popeda, Klamydia, Neljä Ruusua, Kasmir, Mira Luoti, Waldo's People, Juha Tapio, E-Rotic, Petri Nygård, Teflon Brothers, Egotrippi and Agents.

External links 
 Official website (in Finnish)

Rock festivals in Finland
Music festivals in Finland
Festivals in Finland
Music festivals established in 2007